Westbrook Preparatory School is New York State's first co-ed private residential school for 24 middle and high school students with high-functioning autism. It was established after intense lobbying by parents, with the aim of bringing special education students back from out-of-state private schools, through creating publicly financed alternatives closer to home. The school was originally scheduled to open in late fall 2010 and eventually opened in February 2011.

Academics
Westbrook Preparatory School offers an eight-hour school day that provides a state Regents course load and is taught by New York State Certified teachers and teacher's assistants. In addition to courses required for graduation as well as a focus on the arts, students are supposed to have a structured evening that would include homework, meal preparation and chores.

Disagreement regarding location
Officials at SCO (a social services organization) have proposed placing the school in a residential neighborhood which residents have objected. Some of the arguments made on the behalf of the residents were the close proximity of the school to the young children of other schools nearby. They held false stereotypes, assuming that "some autistic people can easily become violent, aggressive and defiant."

References

External links 
 

Autism-related organizations in the United States
Special schools in the United States
Mental health organizations in New York (state)
Educational institutions established in 2011
2011 establishments in New York (state)